William Henry Holmes (or W. H. Holmes; 8 January 1812 – 23 April 1885) was an English pianist and composer, and a teacher at the Royal Academy of Music.

Life
He was born in Sudbury, Derbyshire in 1812, son of a musician. He entered the Royal Academy of Music in 1822, the year it opened, and he gained two of the first medals given by the Academy, for composition and the piano. He became Sub-professor at the academy in 1826, and later Professor of the Piano, remaining in the post for more than fifty years. His pupils included Charlotte Alington Barnard, William Sterndale Bennett, George Alexander Macfarren, Walter Cecil Macfarren and James William Davison.

Holmes performed as a virtuoso pianist for many years. He composed symphonies, concertos, sonatas, songs and an opera.

He died in 1885, and was buried at Brompton Cemetery.

References

1812 births
1885 deaths
People from Sudbury, Derbyshire
Alumni of the Royal Academy of Music
Academics of the Royal Academy of Music
19th-century classical composers
19th-century English musicians
English male classical composers
19th-century pianists
English classical pianists
Burials at Brompton Cemetery
19th-century British composers
19th-century British male musicians